Cornelis (born 27 July 1953) is a West Kalimantan Governor from 2008 to 2018. He got his master degree in law from a university in Pontianak in 2004. He is the second Dayak governor in the province after Oevaang Oeray.

He has been accused by Agus Setiadji, leader of the United Malay People, of sidelining Malays and only giving government jobs and funds to Dayaks. He was reelected once in 2013, and his second term expired on 14 January 2018.

References

External links

Dayak people
1953 births
Living people
People from Sanggau Regency
Bidayuh people
Indonesian Roman Catholics
Iban people
Indonesian Democratic Party of Struggle politicians
Governors of West Kalimantan
Mayors and regents of places in West Kalimantan
Politicians from West Kalimantan
Regents of places in Indonesia